Fossilworks is a portal which provides query, download, and analysis tools to facilitate access to the Paleobiology Database, a large relational database assembled by hundreds of paleontologists from around the world.

History
Fossilworks was created in 1998 by John Alroy and is housed at Macquarie University. It includes many analysis and data visualization tools formerly included in the Paleobiology Database.

References

External links 

Fossilworks

Paleontology websites
Biological databases